Vicki Jessy Becho Desbonne, known as Vicki Becho, is a French footballer  who plays as a Forward for Lyon and the French Under 19s and Under 20s.

Early life

Becho grew up in Montreuil, France. Her idols were Cristiano Ronaldo and Lucho González. She would watch videos of Ronaldo before a match had a pair of Gonzalez' signed boots.

Career

Becho played for SC Malay de Grand after being spotted by Ali Ben Ahmed, a coach at the club. She played until the U12 category and then joined FC Sens in 2015, joining the U13s. Then, in 2016, at 15, Becho joined the PSG Academy.

In February 2020, Becho won the first ever Women's Golden Titi, an honourary trophy for rewarding the best player at the PSG training center.

Becho signed for Lyon from PSG in 2020.

Becho signed on loan to Reims in 2021, which Becho said helped improve her defensive game.

Becho scored her first goal for Lyon in a Coupe de France match against Rodez.

International career

Becho was called up for the UEFA Under 17 Championship Women Qualification, playing all three matches and scoring against Northern Ireland Under 17s and Czech Republic Under 17s.

Becho was called up for the UEFA Under 19 Championship Women Qualification, playing against Greece Women Under 19s and Republic of Ireland Under 19s, scoring against the latter.

Becho scored once against Norway U19 and twice against Spain U19 during the U19 Women's Championship.

She scored in the u19 finals, the first to do so since Ada Hegerberg in 2011.

Becho was named player of the match against Korea Republic under 20s, being highly involved in the game and having a standout performance.

Becho has also been called up to the France Under 20s.

Becho, along with two of her Lyon teammates, was called up to the France Under 23s to play two friendly matches against the USA.

Style of play
Seen as a highly promising player, Becho has "lots of potential", technique and talented finishing, with huge quality in both feet, with power and precision in her shots.

References

Honours
PSG
Coupe de France Féminine (2019/20)
UEFA Women's Champions League (2019/20)

Lyon
Division 1 Féminine (runners up, 2020/21)
Women's International Champions Cup (runners up, 2021) (2022)

France
UEFA Women's Under-19 Championship (2019)
Sud Ladies Cup (runners up, 2022)

External links
 Becho's UEFA Champions League stats

2003 births
Living people
Black French sportspeople
Women's association football forwards
French women's footballers
France women's youth international footballers
Paris Saint-Germain Féminine players
Olympique Lyonnais Féminin players
Stade de Reims Féminines players
Division 1 Féminine players